Philippe Hadengue (17 September 1932 – 18 October 2021) was a French writer and painter, winner of the Inter Book Prize and the Prix Louis-Guilloux in 1989 for Petite chronique des gens de nuit dans un port de l'Atlantique Nord.

Work 
1989: Petite chronique des gens de nuit dans un port de l'Atlantique Nord, éd. Maren Sell — prix du Livre Inter and prix Louis-Guilloux
1989: La Cabane aux écrevisses, éd. Maren Sell
1993: La Loi du cachalot, éd. Calmann-Lévy
1999: Quelqu'un est mort dans la maison d'en face, éd. Pauvert
1999: L'Exode, éd. Pauvert
2001: Un Te Deum en Île-de-France, éd. Pauvert
2006: Lames, éd. Maren Sell

References

External links 
  Philippe Hadengue : Un Te Deum en Ile de France on INA
 Intérieur Nuit on Nouvelobs.com/archives

1932 births
2021 deaths
20th-century French non-fiction writers
21st-century French non-fiction writers
Prix Louis Guilloux winners
Prix du Livre Inter winners
Writers from Paris